Millais is a surname, a given name, and a place name. It may refer to:

People

with Millais as surname
Hugh Millais (1929–2009), British author and actor
John Guille Millais (1865–1931), British artist, naturalist, gardener and travel writer
Millais baronets, several people, including:
John Everett Millais (1829–1896), English painter and illustrator
Raoul Millais (1901–1999), British portrait painter, equestrian artist and sportsman

with Millais as a given name
Millais Culpin (1874–1952), British psychologist

Places
Millais School, English girls' school (Horsham, West Sussex)